Gerardo Miranda Concepción (born 16 November 1956), known simply as Gerardo, is a Spanish former footballer who played as a right-back.

Club career
Gerardo was born in Nouakchott, French West Africa, to Spanish parents working there. During his career he played for UD Las Palmas and FC Barcelona, retiring in 1990 at his first club in the Segunda División; he started out as a winger under manager Roque Olsen, being reconverted by Miguel Muñoz.

Gerardo's best season came in 1984–85, when he appeared in 28 matches and scored three goals as the Catalans won the La Liga title. When his team conquered the 1981–82 edition of the UEFA Cup Winners' Cup, he contributed five appearances.

International career
Gerardo earned nine caps with the Spain national team, but was never selected for any major tournament. His debut was on 20 June 1981, in a 2–0 friendly loss against Portugal where he was deployed as sweeper.

Honours
Barcelona
La Liga: 1984–85
Copa del Rey: 1982–83, 1987–88    
Copa de la Liga: 1983, 1986
European Cup Winners' Cup: 1981–82

See also
List of Spain international footballers born outside Spain

References

External links

1956 births
Living people
People from Nouakchott
Spanish footballers
Association football defenders
La Liga players
Segunda División players
Divisiones Regionales de Fútbol players
UD Las Palmas Atlético players
UD Las Palmas players
FC Barcelona players
Spain amateur international footballers
Spain B international footballers
Spain under-23 international footballers
Spain international footballers